Richard or Rick Sanders may refer to:

Sport
Ricky Sanders (born 1962), American football player
Ricky Sanders (racing driver) (born 1966), former NASCAR driver
Rick Sanders (wrestler) (1945–1972), Olympic wrestler from the United States

Others
Richard Sanders (actor) (born 1940), American actor
Richard B. Sanders, Washington State Supreme Court justice
Richard Sanders (writer) (born 1949), author and former magazine editor
Richard C. Sanders (1915–1976), United States Air Force officer
Ric Sanders (born 1952), English violinist